Hooky the Cripple is a 2002 novel written by Mark Brandon 'Chopper' Read, illustrated by Adam Cullen, and published by Pluto Press. It was formatted as a book for young readers, but by some authorities was considered as containing too much violence for being suitable for children.

Controversy
The book received rather mixed response. While the Queensland government body AccessEd recommended it for secondary schools, a school in Victoria banned it, and likewise the president of the Australian Families Association in Queensland wanted it banned from schools. Read responded, saying "Ban it, just go out and ban it, I am gonna make a fortune if they ban it," believing the publicity from a ban would increase the book's sales.

References

External links 
Sunday Sunrise transcript, interview with Read and Cullen. 

2002 Australian novels
Australian crime novels
Historical novels
Pluto Press books